The Canadian League was a minor league baseball league that operated in Canada in the 19th and early 20th centuries.

The first version of the league operated in 1885, then from 1896–1899, becoming a Class-D league in 1899 and merging into the International League in 1900.

In 1905 there was a four-team class D loop known as the Canadian League. Another league using that title ran from 1911 through 1915 — it was originally ranked a D league as well, moved to a C rating a year later and in 1914 got a B classification.  Frank Shaughnessy managed the Ottawa team from 1913 to 1915.

The league briefly returned in 1905 and then operated again from 1911 to 1915.

Team statistics

1885 
Guelph, ON:  Guelph Maple Leafs
Hamilton, ON:  Hamilton Clippers
Hamilton, ON:  Hamilton Primroses
London, ON:  London Cockneys
Toronto, ON:  Toronto Torontos

1899 
Chatham, Ontario (ON):  Chatham Reds
Guelph, ON:  Guelph Maple Leafs
Hamilton, ON:  Hamilton Blackbirds
London, ON:  London Cockneys
St. Thomas, ON:  St. Thomas Saints
Stratford, ON:  Stratford
Woodstock, ON:  Woodstock

1899 Canadian League
Secretary: Cal Davis
#Stratford (5–20) moved to Woodstock June 8.##Chatham and St. Thomas disbanded July 4.
Home Runs, four players tied with 5.

1905
Brantford, ON:  Brantford Indians
Ingersoll, ON:  Ingersoll
St. Thomas, ON:  St. Thomas Saints
Simcoe, ON:  Simcoe
Woodstock, ON:  Woodstock Maroons

1905 D Canadian League
President: NA
#Simcoe disbanded around July 15.No Individual Statistics Available.

1911–1915
Berlin, ON:  Berlin Green Sox 1911; Berlin Busy Bees 1912–1913
Brantford, ON:  Brantford Red Sox 1911–1915
Erie, PA:  Erie Yankees 1914
Guelph, ON:  Guelph Maple Leafs 1911–1913; Guelph Maple Leafs 1915
Hamilton, ON:  Hamilton Kolts 1911–1912; Hamilton Hams 1913–1915
London, ON:  London Cockneys 1911; London Tecumsehs 1912–1915
Ottawa, ON:  Ottawa Senators 1912–1915
Peterborough, ON:  Peterborough White Caps 1912; Peterborough Petes 1913–1914
St. Thomas, ON:  St. Thomas Saints 1911–1915
Toronto, ON: Toronto Beavers 1914

1911 D Canadian League
President: Donald Ferguson 
No Playoffs Scheduled.

1912 C Canadian League
President:  J. P. Fitzgerald 
No Playoffs Scheduled.

1913 C Canadian League
President:  J. P. Fitzgerald 
No Playoffs Scheduled.

1914 B Canadian League
President:  J. P. Fitzgerald 
No Playoffs Scheduled.

1915 B Canadian League
President:  J. P. Fitzgerald 
No Playoffs Scheduled.

League records, 1911–1915

External links
Baseball Reference

Defunct baseball leagues in Canada
International League
1885 establishments in Canada
1900 disestablishments in Canada
1905 establishments in Canada
1905 disestablishments in Canada
1911 establishments in Canada
1915 disestablishments in Canada
Sports leagues established in 1885
Sports leagues disestablished in 1900
Sports leagues established in 1905
Sports leagues disestablished in 1905
Sports leagues established in 1911
Sports leagues disestablished in 1915